, also known by his moniker , is a Japanese musician and producer who co-founded Flipper's Guitar, an influential Shibuya-kei band, and subsequently embarked on a solo career. In 1997, he released the album Fantasma, which landed him praise from American music critics, who called him a "modern-day Brian Wilson" or the "Japanese Beck". In 2007, Rolling Stone Japan named two of Oyamada's albums amongst the "100 Greatest Japanese Rock Albums of All Time", with Fantasma ranking in 10th place and Camera Talk by Flipper's Guitar ranking in 35th place.

Life and career
Oyamada was born in Setagaya, Tokyo, Japan. His first claim to fame was as a member of the pop duo Flipper's Guitar, one of the key groups of the Tokyo Shibuya-kei scene. Following the disbandment of Flipper's Guitar in 1991, Oyamada donned the "Cornelius" moniker and embarked on a successful solo career. He chose his pseudonym in tribute to the character of the same name from the film Planet of the Apes. He commissioned a song, about himself, on Momus' 1999 album Stars Forever.

In 2005, the Spinto Band referenced him in their song "Japan Is an Island" on their album Nice and Nicely Done.

As of September 2006, he was no longer signed to Matador Records.

In 2006 and 2007 respectively, the song "The Micro Disneycal World Tour" from the Fantasma album, was used for Nick Park's Creature Comforts and Sky television's "Surf, Speak, See" advertisements in the UK. It had also been used several years earlier in an ironic NFL television commercial in the US, which juxtaposed the song's relaxing qualities with video clips showing rapid, aggressive football playmaking.

In 2010, he contributed the song "Katayanagi Twins vs. Sex Bob-Omb" to the film soundtrack of Scott Pilgrim vs. the World.

In 2013, he participated with Taku Satoh and Yugo Nakamura directing the music for the exhibition Design Ah! at 21_21 Design Sight in Tokyo.

Musical style
Cornelius was a pioneer of the Shibuya-kei style of music in Japan. The music of Cornelius could be described as experimental and exploratory, and often incorporates dissonant elements alongside more familiar harmonically "pleasing" sounds. This tension, plus his practice of bringing in sounds and samples from mass culture, pure electronic tones, and sounds from nature (such as on his Point album), lead him to being sometimes characterized as an "acquired taste". American music journalists often describe Cornelius' musical style as being similar to Beck's, whom he acknowledges as an influence along with the Beach Boys, the Jesus and Mary Chain, Primal Scream and the Brazilian band Kassin + 2, among others.

Personal life
Oyamada married musician and collaborator Takako Minekawa in 2000 and they have one child, Milo, named after the son of Cornelius in Planet of the Apes. They divorced in 2012.

He is a second cousin of Joi Ito and Miki Berenyi, the latter who appears on the song "The Spell of a Vanishing Loveliness" from Mellow Waves.

Bullying controversy
In interviews in 1994 and 1995, Oyamada said that he had bullied and assaulted several students with disabilities in school. In one interview, Oyamada dismissed the incidents with a laugh. A dialogue between Oyamada and the victims was planned by the magazine Rockin'On Japan, but all of the victims refused to meet him. One of the victims' mothers picked up the phone and told the interviewer that her son had considered suicide.

On July 14, 2021, the Tokyo Organising Committee of the Olympic and Paralympic Games (TOCOG) announced that Oyamada would be a composer of the 2020 Summer Olympics opening ceremony, with the concept being "the ability to celebrate differences, to empathise, and to live side by side with compassion for one another". The announcement caused a social media backlash due to Oyamada's personal history.

On July 16, a week before the opening ceremony, Oyamada tweeted an apology, but also said articles had contained exaggerations or mistakes that he had not corrected. On the same day, the TOCOG issued a statement stating they were unaware of the interviews and that while Oyamada's actions were "very inappropriate", they had not dismissed him from the ceremony. Toshirō Mutō, the chief executive of the Organising Committee and ex-chairman of Kaisei Academy, said he wanted Oyamada to remain. On July 19, Oyamada decided to leave the creative team for the Tokyo Olympics on his own terms.

In September 2021, Oyamada appeared in a two-hour interview with Shūkan Bunshun addressing why he took so many years to address his past actions. He made an additional statement which stated how a blog post that circulated online edited information from past interviews to describe Oyamada as the perpetrator, even though the original Quick Japan interview stated that he did not commit the acts in question. There is a statement on Oyamada's official Cornelius website, from the artist himself, that addresses these matters in depth.

Discography

The discography of Cornelius consists of six studio albums, three soundtracks, eight remix albums, three extended plays, fourteen singles and seven video albums.

Studio albums

Soundtracks
 Ghost in the Shell: Arise (Warner Music Japan; January 23, 2013) – JP #33
 The Cat That Lived a Million Times (Warner Music Japan; October 31, 2013) (EP)
 Ghost in the Shell: The New Movie O.S.T. (Flying Dog; June 15, 2015) – JP #62

Remix albums

Extended plays
Holidays in the Sun (September 10, 1993) JP #12
Cornelius Works 1999 (1999), rare CD-R promo from 3-D Corporation Ltd. (Japan)
Gum EP (2008)

Singles

Video
Promotions! (1994), music videos
Love Heavy Metal Style Music Vision (1994) – live performances
EUS (2000) – live performances
Five Point One (2003) – a DVD package of music videos and PM
From Nakameguro to Everywhere Tour '02–'04 (2008) – live performances
Sensurround (2008) – a DVD version of Sensuous with accompanying videos and 5.1 surround sound
Sensuous Synchronized Show (2009) – live performances

Compilation appearances
Tribute Spirits (May 1, 1999)
DJ-Kicks: Erlend Øye (April 19, 2004)
Matador at Fifteen (October 12, 2004)
The Wired CD: Rip. Sample. Mash. Share. (April 22, 2009)

Other works
Coloris (2006) – a Nintendo bit Generations game for Game Boy Advance
 Cornelius appeared on the TV show Yo Gabba Gabba! performing a version of his song "Count Five or Six" as a way to teach kids how to count (at least up to six). This can be seen on the episode titled "Share".
"Count Five or Six" appears on the soundtrack to the TV series Spaced.
 Composed music played by the Katayanagi Twins characters in the film Scott Pilgrim vs. the World.
 Produced Salyu's S(o)un(d)beams (2011)
 Composed the soundtrack to the anime series Ghost in the Shell: Arise (2013)

References

External links

cornelius-sound.com – official website 
 corneliusjapan.com – semi-official website
 Nippop Profile | Cornelius
 Matador Records' Cornelius page
 Cornelius rocks – Jaime Holguin from the Associated Press explores the allure of Japan's Keigo Oyamada. A May 2007 Associated Press/asap written and video piece about Cornelius.
Cornelius at Shepherd Bush Empire – Dominic Haley from Spoonfed Media writes about the intrigue of the unexpected in Cornelius' music.
 Interview with Oyamada Keigo  – Manny Santiago goes to the 3D Studio in Nakameguro, Tokyo for Heso magazine.
 

1969 births
Living people
Art rock musicians
Japanese electronic musicians
Japanese multi-instrumentalists
Matador Records artists
Musicians from Setagaya
Plastic Ono Band members
Remixers
Shibuya-kei musicians